Kiron is a town in Crawford County, Iowa, United States. The population was 267 at the time of the 2020 census.

History 
Kiron was platted in 1899. It was supposedly named after a place in China.

Another popular etymology is that the town was named after the Kidron Valley, in the Bible, but due to a typographical error, the D had been omitted.

Geography
Kiron is located at  (42.196099, −95.327070).

Kiron is six miles east of U.S. Route 59 at Iowa Highway 39.

Demographics

2010 census
As of the census of 2010, there were 279 people, 121 households, and 77 families living in the city. The racial makeup of the city was 91.4% White, 8.2% from other races, and 0.4% from two or more races. Hispanic or Latino of any race were 16.1% of the population.

There were 121 households, of which 24.8% had children under the age of 18 living with them, 47.9% were married couples living together, 8.3% had a female householder with no husband present, 7.4% had a male householder with no wife present, and 36.4% were non-families. 28.9% of all households were made up of individuals, and 13.2% had someone living alone who was 65 years of age or older. The average household size was 2.31 and the average family size was 2.74.

The median age in the city was 46.6 years. 21.9% of residents were under the age of 18; 6.4% were between the ages of 18 and 24; 20.5% were from 25 to 44; 28.3% were from 45 to 64; and 22.9% were 65 years of age or older. The gender makeup of the city was 52.0% male and 48.0% female.

2000 census
As of the census of 2000, there were 273 people, 126 households, and 75 families living in the city. The racial makeup of the city was 95.24% White, 1.47% Native American, 2.20% from other races, and 1.10% from two or more races. Hispanic or Latino of any race were 2.56% of the population.

There were 126 households, out of which 23.0% had children under the age of 18 living with them, 49.2% were married couples living together, 8.7% had a female householder with no husband present, and 39.7% were non-families. 35.7% of all households were made up of individuals, and 20.6% had someone living alone who was 65 years of age or older. The average household size was 2.17 and the average family size was 2.76.

In the city, the population was spread out, with 23.1% under the age of 18, 6.2% from 18 to 24, 17.9% from 25 to 44, 29.3% from 45 to 64, and 23.4% who were 65 years of age or older. The median age was 46 years. For every 100 females, there were 96.4 males. For every 100 females age 18 and over, there were 96.3 males.

The median income for a household in the city was $31,429, and the median income for a family was $34,861. Males had a median income of $28,750 versus $17,500 for females. The per capita income for the city was $16,061. About 11.3% of families and 14.7% of the population were below the poverty line, including 20.3% of those under the age of eighteen and 7.9% of those 65 or over.

Education
The Denison Community School District operates area public schools.

Notable people
 Steve King, U.S. Representative
 Wallace Clauson, WWII and Cold War engineer

References

Cities in Iowa
Cities in Crawford County, Iowa
Populated places established in 1899
1899 establishments in Iowa